Humphrey Mitchell,  (September 9, 1894 – August 1, 1950) was a Canadian politician and trade unionist.

Life and career 
A land surveyor employed with Hamilton Hydro, Mitchell was active with the union movement in the city. Upon the death of Hamilton East's Conservative Member of Parliament (MP), George Septimus Rennie in 1931, Mitchell was approached to run in the by-election to fill the seat as a Labour candidate. Hamilton East was a strong working class riding that had elected Labour candidates to the Legislative Assembly of Ontario and to city council.

The Liberals, in opposition having lost the previous year's general election did not run a candidate against Mitchell in order to avoid dividing the anti-Conservative vote. Given future events, it is also possible the Liberals believed that Mitchell would support the Liberal Party unofficially if elected.

Mitchell won the by-election, and entered the House of Commons of Canada. He did not get along well with the rump of Independent Labour MPs led informally by J.S. Woodsworth and referred to as the "Ginger Group". While Mitchell attended the "founding meeting" of the Co-operative Commonwealth Federation in William Irvine's office, he refused to join the new party when Labour MPs joined with farmers groups, socialist groups and others to officially launch the CCF in 1932 and refused to work with its supporters in Parliament.

In the 1935 general election, the CCF ran a candidate against Mitchell in Hamilton East (while the Liberals, again, ran no candidate). The split in the labour and anti-Tory vote resulted in the Conservative candidate defeating Mitchell despite the nationwide trend against the Conservatives.

Mitchell did not run in the 1940 election, however, following the death of Welland's Liberal MP in late 1941, Mitchell was appointed to the Cabinet of William Lyon Mackenzie King as Minister of Labour, and was elected shortly thereafter as the new Liberal MP for Welland. He served as Welland's MP and as Labour minister in the governments of King and Louis St. Laurent until his death in 1950.

Mitchell became Labour minister just over a year after the introduction of unemployment insurance in Canada, and oversaw the early implementation and expansion of the program. He also oversaw the mobilization of the labour force during World War II, and the widespread introduction of women into war production.

With the responsibilities his department had for immigration, he also had a controversial role in advocating and implementing the deportation or detention of tens of thousands of Japanese Canadians during the war.

External links
 

1894 births
1950 deaths
Labour MPs in Canada
Liberal Party of Canada MPs
Members of the House of Commons of Canada from Ontario
Members of the King's Privy Council for Canada